Mount Fedallah is a mountain approximately  high, situated east of the Pip Cliffs, on the north side of Flask Glacier, in the south-east foothills of Madrid Dome in Aristotle Mountains, eastern Graham Land Antarctica. It was named by the UK Antarctic Place-Names Committee in 1987, after a crewman of the Pequod in association with other names from Moby-Dick in this area.

References 

Mountains of Graham Land
Oscar II Coast
Moby-Dick